Arran Hoffmann (28 August 1902 – 18 June 1990) was a German sports shooter. He competed in the 50 m rifle event at the 1936 Summer Olympics.

References

1902 births
1990 deaths
German male sport shooters
Olympic shooters of Germany
Shooters at the 1936 Summer Olympics
Place of birth missing
20th-century German people